Maadathy, also known internationally as Maadathy: An Unfairy Tale, is a 2019 Indian-Tamil language folklore drama film written, directed and produced by Leena Manimekalai under the banner of Karuvachy films and co-produced by Piiyush Singh (Golden Ratio Films), Bhavana Goparaju, and Abinandhan Ramanujam. The film stars Ajmina Kassim, Patrick Raj, Semmalar Annam and Arul Kumar in the lead roles.  

The film was premiered at Busan International Film Festival 2019 and received a positive critical response. The film later got released in the OTT platform Neestream globally on  24, June 2021.

Plot 
The film is set in the backdrop of a river which acts as a symbol of the oppressor and the oppressed. The river is a way out, for the lead character a Dalit, Yosana; a liberation from the blind realities of caste. India is a land of Subaltern deities. Each deity has a unique legend and these legends are often interwoven with socio-historic tropes of India. Puthirai vannaar is an 'unseeable' Dalit caste group, in southern India. Their forced-occupation is to wash clothes of other Dalits, the dead and the menstruating women. This film is a tale about a young girl who grew up in Puthirai vannaar caste group and how she came to be immortalized as their local deity, Maadathy.

Cast 
 Ajmina Kassim as Yosana
 Semmalar Annam as Veni
 Arul Kumar as Sudalai
 Patrick Raj

Critical reception 
News Minute reviewed "It's rare to see a film where the male body is subjected to the female gaze". The Cinema Express wrote, "Remarkably exudes the power of cinema, of storytelling that is poignantly reflective of a society where legends of sin circle and haunt our deities".

Awards  
 World Premiere, Busan International Film Festival, October 2019.
 India Premiere, International Competition, Kolkata International Film Festival, November 2019.

References

External links 

2010s Tamil-language films
2010 films

Films scored by Karthik Raja